Neodymium nitrate is a chemical compound with the formula Nd(NO3)3. It is typically encountered as the hexahydrate, Nd(NO3)3·6H2O, which is more accurately formulated as [Nd(NO3)3(H2O)4].2H2O to reflect the crystal structure. It decomposes to NdONO3 at elevated temperature. This water-soluble salt finds use in fabrication of perovskite (CaTiO3) based solid oxide fuel cells, synthesis of Nd3+ doped vanadium pentoxide (VO5) nanostructure for potential usage in supercapacitors and as a catalyst for Friedlander synthesis of surface modified quinolones for application in medicinal chemistry.

References

External links
 Neodymium Nitrate at americanelements.com

Neodymium compounds
Nitrates